Ukrainian Higher League (Vyscha liga/ Вища ліга) is the second-tier basketball competition in Ukraine, after Ukrainian Basketball SuperLeague.

Current teams (2020-2021)

Group 1 

 Kryvbas
 Mykolaiv 2
 Politekhnik
 Mariupol
 SumDU Sumy
 Dnipro 2
 Prometey 2
 Invasport
 Novomoskovsk

Group 2 

 Rivne
 VolynBasket
 Zhytomyr
 Khimik 2
 BIPA Odessa SDYUSSOR
 Cherkaski Mavpy 2
 Politekhnika Lvov
 Goverla

References

External links 

 https://fbu.ua/statistics/league-8185/standings
 https://www.eurobasket.com/ukraine/basketball-higher-league.aspx

Basketball leagues in Ukraine
Basketball
Professional sports leagues in Ukraine